Molin is a surname.

Geographical distribution
As of 2014, 33.1% of all known bearers of the surname Molin were residents of Sweden (frequency 1:1,916), 11.9% of Italy (1:33,153), 10.7% of France (1:40,186), 8.0% of the United States (1:290,162), 7.6% of Brazil (1:172,293), 4.1% of Russia (1:225,103), 3.5% of Denmark (1:10,338), 3.2% of the Philippines (1:204,106), 2.9% of Bangladesh, 1.2% of Spain (1:258,832), 1.1% of Poland (1:213,532), 1.1% of the Czech Republic (1:62,920), 1.1% of Finland (1:33,517), 1.0% of the Netherlands (1:104,207), 1.0% of Haiti (1:68,928) and 1.0% of Austria (1:57,529).

In Sweden, the frequency of the surname was higher than national average (1:1,916) in the following counties:
 1. Västernorrland County (1:632)
 2. Gotland County (1:824)
 3. Örebro County (1:846)
 4. Jämtland County (1:972)
 5. Västerbotten County (1:1,429)
 6. Gävleborg County (1:1,451)
 7. Kalmar County (1:1,597)

In Italy, the frequency of the surname was higher than national average (1:33,153) in only one region: Veneto (1:2,909)

In France, the frequency of the surname was higher than national average (1:40,186) in the following regions:
 1. Hauts-de-France (1:14,268)
 2. Auvergne-Rhône-Alpes (1:22,844)
 3. Bourgogne-Franche-Comté (1:28,988)
 4. Île-de-France (1:37,122)
 5. Réunion (1:38,788)

People
 Adrian Molin (1880-1942), Swedish far-right writer and political activist
 Bud Molin (Henry David Molin, 1925-2007), American film editor and television director
 Emil Molin (born 1993), Swedish ice hockey player
 Francesco Molin (1575-1655), Doge of Venice
 Johan Molin (born 1976), Swedish ice hockey player
 Lars Molin (disambiguation), multiple people
 Nicolò Molin (1562-1608), Venetian diplomat
 Ove Molin (born 1971), Swedish ice hockey player
 Paolo Dal Molin (born 1987), Italian track and field athlete
 Raffaele Molin (1825-87), Italian physician, geologist and zoologist (ichthyologist and parasitologist)

See also
 Paolo Dal Molin (b. 1987), Italian athlete
 Tommaso Dal Molin (1902–1930), Italian aviator

References